Being Twenty (also known as To Be Twenty) is a 1978 Italian erotic-drama film directed by Fernando Di Leo and starring Gloria Guida and Lilli Carati.

Plot 

Lia (Gloria Guida) and Tina (Lilli Carati) are two beautiful girls who meet and realize that they have a lot in common. They are both young, beautiful and pissed off, so they decide to hitchhike their way to Rome to find a commune where they can stay and live the life of free love... or so they think. Things don't go as they have planned though, and soon they become entangled with prostitution, the police and an aggressive gang.

Cast 
 Gloria Guida - Lia 
 Lilli Carati - Tina 
 Ray Lovelock - Rico 
 Vincenzo Crocitti - Riccetto 
 Giorgio Bracardi - Commissario Maresciallo Zambo 
 Leopoldo Mastelloni - Arguinas 
 Roberto Reale - Head of rapists 
 Serena Bennato - Lesbian car driver 
 Daniele Vargas - Prof. Affatati 
 Vittorio Caprioli - Nazariota 
 Licinia Lentini - Lesbian 
 Daniela Doria - Patrizia 
 Raul Lovecchio - Vice-commissioner (as Raoul Lo Vecchio) 
 Fernando Cerulli - Retired civil servant

Release 

The film was released as a 2-Disc DVD by Raro Video on July 28, 2011.

References

External links
 

1978 films
1970s erotic drama films
Italian erotic drama films
1970s Italian-language films
Films directed by Fernando Di Leo
Films set in Rome
Films shot in Rome
1978 drama films
1970s Italian films